Portage Lake County Park is a park in Waterloo Township, Michigan.

A picnic area with grills, a playground, a swimming area, a boat launch, a historic pump house, and portable toilets are available at the  park.

References

Parks in Michigan
Protected areas of Jackson County, Michigan